Stasys is a popular Lithuanian given name, derived from Slavic name Stanislav. Feminine variation is Stasė.

Stasys Antanas Bačkis (1906–1999), Lithuanian diplomat
Stasys Eidrigevičius (born 1949), graphic artist
Stasys Girėnas (1893–1933), Lithuanian-American pilot
Stasys Lozoraitis (1898–1983), Lithuanian diplomat
Stasys Lozoraitis Jr. (1924–1994), Lithuanian diplomat
Stasys Povilaitis (1947–2015), Lithuanian singer
Stasys Raštikis (1896–1985), Lithuanian general
Stasys Razma (1899–1941), Lithuanian footballer
Stasys Šilingas (1885–1962), Lithuanian lawyer and statesman
Stasys Šimkus (1887–1943), Lithuanian composer
Stasys Stonkus (born 1931), Lithuanian basketball player

Lithuanian masculine given names